Burn Out at the Hydrogen Bar is the debut studio album of industrial rock band Chemlab, released on March 22, 1993 by Fifth Colvmn and Metal Blade Records. It represents the band's only studio release via the label Metal Blade and was reissued by Invisible Records on November 30, 1999. Each "suture" is an instrumental piece splitting the main tracks apart. The track "Suicide Jag" was featured in the game Saints Row: The Third. The album was produced by Jeff "Critter" Newell and has been considered by critics to be a defining moment within the coldwave genre. In 2018 Chemlab embarked on a tour featuring Dead on TV and GoFight members Daniel Evans, Vince McAley, and Mike Love backing Louche to celebrate the twenty fifth anniversary of the Burn Out at the Hydrogen Bar. On June 18th, 2021 a remaster of the album was released.

Reception

Aiding & Abetting gave Burn Out at the Hydrogen Bar a mixed to positive review, commending the guitar work and calling the music "user-friendly industrial dance stuff." Rick Anderson of allmusic awarded the album four out of five stars and said "the band's debut album reveals a group lurching toward tightly controlled sonic pandemonium while still maintaining a firm grip on old-fashioned, blippy, synth riffs and the occasional shred of actual melody." Sonic Boom described Chemlab as "one of the few true industrial rock bands" and "buried deep under the surface of music are influences so diverse and spread out that one would wonder why this particular fusion of decayed guitars and hybrid electronics would be the music of choice of this east coast duo."

Track listing

Personnel
Adapted from the Burn Out at the Hydrogen Bar liner notes.

Chemlab
 Jared Louche – lead vocals, arrangements, production, art direction, additional programming (3, 9)
 Dylan Thomas More – sampler, programming, loops, arrangements, production, art direction, additional programming (3, 9)

Additional performers
 Martin Atkins – remix (14)
 Mark Blasquez – remix (15)
 Mark Kermanj – drums
 Geno Lenardo – sampler (3)
 Ned Wahl – bass guitar
 Steve Watson – guitar

Production and design
 Duane Buford – assistant engineering
 Eric Carter – assistant engineering
 Bill Garcelon – assistant engineering
 Zalman Fishman – executive-producer
 Matthias Heilbronn – editing
 Phil Merkle – cover art, art direction
 Newton More – photography
 Jeff "Critter" Newell – production
 Scott Larson – assistant engineering
 Geno Lenardo – assistant engineering
 Dalton Portella – art direction
 Brett Smith – design

Release history

References

External links 
 

1993 debut albums
Chemlab albums
Fifth Colvmn Records albums
Invisible Records albums
Metal Blade Records albums
Albums produced by Jared Louche